Travis Oliphant is an American data scientist and businessman. He is a co-founder of NumFOCUS, 501(c)(3) nonprofit charity in the United States, and sits on its advisory board. He is also a founder of technology startup Anaconda (previously Continuum Analytics). In addition, Travis is the primary creator of NumPy and founding contributor to the SciPy packages in the Python programming language.

Early life and education 
Oliphant has a Ph.D. in Biomedical Engineering from the Mayo Clinic and B.S. and M.S. degrees in Mathematics and Electrical Engineering from Brigham Young University.

Career 
Oliphant was an Assistant Professor of Electrical and Computer Engineering at Brigham Young University from 2001 to 2007. In addition, he directed the BYU Biomedical Imaging Lab, and performed research on scanning impedance imaging.

Oliphant served as President of Enthought from 2007 until 2011.  He founded Continuum Analytics in January 2012 (subsequently renamed to Anaconda Inc.). Continuum makes the Python distribution Anaconda. In July 2015 Continuum Analytics received 24 million dollars in Series A Funding. Continuum Analytics received a $100,000 award from DARPA for the feasibility of designing a high-level data-parallel language extension to Python on graphics processing units (GPUs). On January 1, 2018, Oliphant announced he was leaving Anaconda Inc. He subsequently co-founded Quansight later that same year.

He is also a member of the advisory council of the non-profit scientific computing foundation NumFOCUS.

Books written
Oliphant is the author of the textbook Guide To NumPy and associated manuals.

Articles

References

External links 

Brigham Young University alumni
Living people
Place of birth missing (living people)
Python (programming language) people
American statisticians
Data scientists
1971 births